The Rear Guard is a 1976 pilot episode for an American adaptation of the British situation comedy Dad's Army. Set in World War II, The Rear Guard followed a band of men in the American Civil Defense who were part of an auxiliary force in the event of an invasion of the US. The episode was an adaptation of "The Deadly Attachment", in which a German U-Boat crew are placed under the supervision of the platoon.

The pilot was aired on Tuesday, 10 August 1976 by the American Broadcasting Company (ABC). However, it was not commissioned as a series. As it was considered a failure, the original tapes were wiped. However copies of the show are in the possession of the show's director Hal Cooper and other producers that were associated with the show.

Characters
As The Rear Guard was a remake of Dad's Army, it included many of the same characters under alternative names. Here is a list of the characters and their original counterparts:

 Captain Nick Rosatti (Captain Mainwaring) – played by Cliff Norton
 Sergeant Max Raskin (Sergeant Wilson) – played by Lou Jacobi 
 Bert Wagner (Lance Corporal Jones) – played by Eddie Foy Jr.
 Don Crawford (Private Walker) – played by John McCook 
 Bobby Henderson (Private Pike) – played by Dennis Kort

The characters of Privates Godfrey and Frazer were not included in the remake.

External links

References

American television series based on British television series
Dad's Army
Television pilots not picked up as a series
Military humor in film
1970s American comedy television series